MacArabic encoding is an obsolete encoding for Arabic (and English) text that was used in Apple Macintosh computers to texts.

The encoding is identical to MacFarsi encoding, except the numerals.

References

See also
 MacFarsi encoding
 Arabic script in Unicode

Character sets
Arabic
Arabic script